Iron Mine Branch is a  long second-order tributary to Marshyhope Creek in Sussex County, Delaware.

Course
Iron Mine Branch rises on the Bridgeville Branch divide at Dublin Hill, Delaware, and then flows generally northwest to join Marshyhope Creek about 1.5 miles south-southwest of Woodenhawk, Delaware.

Watershed
Iron Mine Branch drains  of area, receives about 44.8 in/year of precipitation, and is about 3.04% forested.

See also
List of rivers of Delaware

References

Rivers of Delaware
Rivers of Sussex County, Delaware